Zina Lynna Garrison (born November 16, 1963) is an American former professional tennis player. Garrison was the runner-up in singles at the 1990 Wimbledon Championships, a three-time major mixed doubles champion, and an Olympic gold and bronze medalist from the women's doubles and singles events, respectively, at the 1988 Seoul Olympics. Garrison reached a career-high singles ranking of world No. 4 on 20 November 1989.

Career
The youngest of seven children, Garrison started playing tennis at the age of 10 and entered her first tournament at the age of 12. At 14, she won the national girls' 18s title. In 1981, she won both the Wimbledon and US Open junior titles and was ranked the world No. 1 junior player. Garrison graduated from Sterling High School in Houston, Texas in 1982.

Garrison began suffering from the eating disorder bulimia when she was 19, following the death of her mother. "I had never been comfortable with my looks and felt I had lost the only person who loved me unconditionally", Garrison told the Observer Sport Monthly in 2006. "The pressure of being labeled 'the next Althea Gibson' only made things worse. I felt I was never going to be allowed to grow into just becoming me."

Garrison turned professional in 1982, and skipped her graduation at Ross Sterling High School to compete in the French Open, her first tournament as a professional, where she reached the quarterfinals. She was awarded the WTA Newcomer of the Year in 1982.

Despite battling bulimia during her first few years on the tour, Garrison enjoyed notable success on-court. She reached the Australian Open semifinals in 1983, her first full year on the tour, and finished the year ranked world No. 10. She won her first top-level singles titles in 1984 at the European Indoor Championships in Zürich. In 1985, Garrison beat world no. 3 Hana Mandlíková and world no. 2 Chris Evert on her way to winning the Amelia Island Championships. She was also a Wimbledon semifinalist in 1985, and in 1986, she won her first tour doubles at the Canadian Open (partnering Gabriela Sabatini).

At the Australian Open in 1987, Garrison won the mixed doubles (partnering Sherwood Stewart) and finished runner-up in the women's doubles (partnering Lori McNeil). A year later, Garrison and Stewart captured the mixed doubles title at Wimbledon.

At the 1988 Olympic Games in Seoul, Garrison teamed with Pam Shriver to win the women's doubles gold medal for the United States, defeating Jana Novotná and Helena Suková of Czechoslovakia in the final. Garrison defeated Shriver in the quarterfinals of the singles event, where she won a bronze medal. At the US Open, she defeated defending champion Navratilova for the first time in her career, advancing to the semifinals, where she lost to Sabatini.

In 1989, Garrison defeated Chris Evert 7–6, 6–2 in the quarterfinals of the US Open in Evert's final tournament. Garrison lost to Navratilova in the semifinals. She finished 1989 ranked a career-high world No. 4 in singles.

The highlight of Garrison's career came in 1990 at Wimbledon, as she defeated Samantha Smith, Cecilia Dahlman, Andrea Leand, Helena Suková, then French Open champion Monica Seles in the quarterfinals 3–6, 6–3, 9–7, and defending Wimbledon champion and world No. 1 Steffi Graf in the semifinals 6–3, 3–6, 6–4 to reach her only Grand Slam singles final, becoming the first African-American woman to do so since Gibson. Moreover, it ended Graf's record 13-time streak of Grand Slam finals. Then, she lost to Navratilova 6–4, 6–1, who thus won her record ninth women's singles title at Wimbledon. Garrison claimed her third mixed doubles title at Wimbledon that year (partnering Rick Leach).

In 1992, Garrison finished runner-up in the Australian Open women's doubles (partnering Mary Joe Fernandez).

At Wimbledon in 1994, Garrison beat world no. 2 Arantxa Sanchez-Vicario on the way to her 15th and final Grand Slam quarterfinal appearance.

Garrison retired from professional tennis in 1996. From 1982 to 1995, she remained uninterrupted in the world's top 25. During her career, she won 14 top-level singles titles and 20 doubles titles.

Personal life and post-tennis career
Garrison married Willard Jackson in September 1989; however, the marriage ended in divorce in 1997.

Since retiring from the tour, Garrison has worked as a television commentator and maintained active roles in the community and in tennis. She founded the Zina Garrison Foundation for the Homeless in 1988, and the Zina Garrison All-Court Tennis Program, which supports inner-city tennis in Houston, in 1992. She has also served as a member of the United States President's Council on Physical Fitness and Sports. She is a member of Alpha Kappa Alpha sorority.

Garrison has maintained a presence on the professional tennis scene, and was the captain for the U.S. Federation Cup (later Fed Cup) team. Garrison also led the U.S. women's team at the 2008 Beijing Games tennis event where team members Venus and Serena Williams won a gold medal in doubles.

After "piling on weight" in her 40s, Garrison participated in season 16 of the reality TV competition The Biggest Loser, titled The Biggest Loser: Glory Days, which premiered September 11, 2014 on NBC. Despite losing 8 lbs., she was the first person eliminated from the program.

Playing style
Garrison played an attacking style. It was common for her to slice her backhand and attack the net (a chip-and-charge tactic). Garrison had excellent volleys and overheads. She was able to rally when she wanted to but her main game plan was to get to the net so she could finish with the volley.

Major finals

Grand Slam tournaments

Singles: 1 (1 runner–up)

Doubles: 2 (2 runner-ups)

Mixed doubles: 6 (3 titles, 3 runner-ups)

Olympics

Singles: 1 bronze medal

Garrison lost in the semifinals to Steffi Graf 2–6, 0–6. In 1988, there was no bronze medal play-off match, both beaten semifinal players received bronze medals.

Doubles: 1 gold medal

WTA career finals

Singles: 36 (14–22)

Doubles: 46 (20–26)

Grand Slam performance timelines

Singles

Doubles

Mixed doubles

References

Bibliography
 A. P. Porter, Zina Garrison: Ace, First Ave. Editions, 1992

External links
 
 
 
 
 ESPN biography
 

1963 births
African-American female tennis players
American female tennis players
Australian Open (tennis) champions
Hopman Cup competitors
Living people
Olympic bronze medalists for the United States in tennis
Olympic gold medalists for the United States in tennis
Tennis commentators
Tennis players from Houston
Tennis players at the 1988 Summer Olympics
Tennis players at the 1992 Summer Olympics
Wimbledon champions
Wimbledon junior champions
US Open (tennis) junior champions
Grand Slam (tennis) champions in mixed doubles
Grand Slam (tennis) champions in girls' singles
Medalists at the 1988 Summer Olympics
21st-century African-American people
21st-century African-American women
20th-century African-American sportspeople
20th-century African-American women
20th-century African-American people